The Divisional Railway Hospital, also known as the Ponmalai railway hospital, is a secondary hospital in Golden Rock, in the Tiruchirappalli district, Tamil Nadu, India. This hospital is managed by the Southern Railway zone's Tiruchirappalli railway division.  It serves active and retired Indian Railway employees and their families.

History 
The hospital is located amidst the Railway Quarters in Golden Rock, near the Golden Rock Railway Workshop and Golden Rock Shandy.  Established in 1927 by the erstwhile South Indian Railway Company, it is the oldest hospital in the Southern Railway zone  older than the Zonal hospital at Perambur, which was constructed in 1928.  It is part of Indian Railway Medical Services, which maintains a large network of hospitals  56 divisional and 9 zonal.

Administration 
The personnel health care in Indian Railways is managed by the Director General of Railway Health Services under the Railway Health Directorate, an apex body at the Railway Board. The Chief Medical Director of the Southern Railway zone oversees the health affairs at the zonal level, under which five divisional hospitals function at Arakkonam, Madurai, Palakkad, Thiruvananthapuram, and Golden Rock, headed by Chief Medical Superintendents. As of 2016, the officer in charge of the hospital is the Chief Medical Officer, Dr R. Soundararajan, an orthopod, who reports to Dr P. Velusamy, the Chief Medical Superintendent for the Tiruchirappalli railway division.

Background 

Being one of 56 divisional railway hospitals in India, the hospital functions exclusively for the benefit of serving and retired railway employees and their families, comprising about 100,000 people belonging to the Tiruchirappalli railway division and spanning 10 districts of Tamil Nadu.

Facilities 

The hospital has 21 full-time doctors in seven departments: gynaecology, ophthalmology, psychiatry, dental surgery, anaesthesiology, physiotheraphy, orthopediatrics and telemedicine. These are supplemented with a  clinical laboratory, digital X-ray unit, ultrasound scan, operation theater, casualty department, ambulance, treadmill, intensive care unit, and blood bank facilities. Additionally, specialists in the field of urology, ophthalmology, psychiatry, and medicine are occasionally engaged on an ad hoc basis for the patients.

Developments 
The hospital, which is visited by about 600 outpatients daily, also has 197 beds for inpatients, including the 2016 addition of a 100-bed surgical ward. About 5 LED television sets and playing equipment for the children at hospital were donated from the Railway Staff Benefit fund.

See also 
 Southern Railway Headquarters Hospital, Chennai
 List of hospitals in India

Notes

References

Further reading

External links 

Hospital buildings completed in 1927
1927 establishments in India
Hospitals in Tiruchirappalli
+
TIRUCHIRAPPALLI
Hospitals established in 1927
20th-century architecture in India